Planodes is a genus of longhorn beetles of the subfamily Lamiinae, containing the following species:

 Planodes ambonensis Breuning & Chûjô, 1965
 Planodes annamensis Breuning, 1957
 Planodes denticornis (Chevrolat, 1858)
 Planodes deterrens Pascoe, 1865
 Planodes encaustus Pascoe, 1865
 Planodes eximius Aurivillius, 1926
 Planodes gebeensis Breuning, 1970
 Planodes johorensis Breuning, 1936
 Planodes leporinus Pascoe, 1865
 Planodes longemaculatus Breuning, 1960
 Planodes luctuosus Pascoe, 1865
 Planodes papuanus Breuning, 1948
 Planodes papulosus Pascoe, 1865
 Planodes pseudosatelles Breuning, 1948
 Planodes quaternarius Newman, 1842
 Planodes satelles Pascoe, 1865
 Planodes stratus Heller, 1900
 Planodes toekanensis Breuning, 1959
 Planodes variegatus Aurivillius, 1911
 Planodes vicarius Pascoe, 1865

References

 
Mesosini